Marianne Smit (born 1984) is a Dutch harpist.

Biography 
Marianne Smit started playing the harp in 1995 when she was nine years old. Initially she was taught by her mother Gertru Smit-Pasveer, the sister of flutist Kathinka Pasveer. After one year she became student of Anke Anderson.

She was among the first to be entered into the Young Talent department of the Amsterdam Conservatory in 1998, where she received the guidance of Erika Waardenburg.

Her aunt's close associate Karlheinz Stockhausen composed a harp duet for Smit and Esther Kooi, Freude, which premiered on June 7, 2006 in the Duomo of Milan.

She passed her Bachelor's exam cum laude in June 2007. 

Smit has participated in audition training with Petra van der Heide, a harpist with the Royal Concertgebouw Orchestra. In this course she won the first prize which earned her a spot on the orchestra in two of their concerts. She has participated several times in productions of the Dutch Radio Philharmonic Orchestra.

CD recordings
Karlheinz Stockhausen - Freude für 2 Harfen, 2. Stunde aus Klang (Die 24 Stunden des Tages), Marianne Smit and Esther Kooi (2006)
Strings Attached, Dutch Youth String Orchestra, conductor Johannes Leertouwer, with Marianne Smit and Giselle Boeters in Concertino in an Old Style by Maciej Malecki (2007)

Awards 
Prinses Christina Concours: 1st prize 1998 & 2002
SJMN Musictalent Concours: 1st prize 1998, 2002 & 2004 
Dutch National Harpconcours: Finalist 2000
Freude (Joy) - Stockhausen: World Premiere Milan 2006 
Royal Philharmonic Society (RPS) Music Award (UK): Nomination for performance in season 2008

External links

References 
 

1984 births
Living people
Dutch harpists
Conservatorium van Amsterdam alumni
People from Zaanstad